The National Badminton Federation of Russia (NBFR) is the governing body for the sport of badminton in Russia. Based in Moscow, the NBFR has been a member since 1992 of Badminton Europe, the regional organization for the Badminton World Federation. The organization was established as one of the successors to CIS Badminton (1991-1992) and USSR Badminton Federation (1962-1991) after the dissolution of the Soviet Union. The NFBR became the sole administrator for the Russia national badminton team when the  Russian Badminton Federation (RBF) was dissolved by the Russian Olympic Committee in 2005.

After the 2022 Russian invasion of Ukraine, the Badminton World Federation (BWF) banned all Russian players and officials from BWF events, and cancelled all BWF tournaments in Russia. Badminton Europe declared the National Badminton Federation of Russia not in Good Standing.

Tournaments
 Russian Open
 White Nights

Presidents

References

Russia
Badminton in Russia
Badminton
1992 establishments in Russia